Olethreutinae is a subfamily of moths in the family Tortricidae.

Genera incertae sedis
This tortricine genus has not been assigned to a tribe yet:
Melanalopha

References 
 Olethreutine Moths of the Midwestern United States, An Identification Guide
Gilligan, Todd M., Donald J. Wright, and Loran D. Gibson. 2008. Ohio Biological Survey, P.O. Box 21370, Columbus, Ohio 43221-0370.
 Bugguide.net. Subfamily Olethreutinae